Triplarina calophylla is a species of flowering plant in the myrtle family, Myrtaceae and is endemic to a restricted area of north Queensland. It is a shrub with egg-shaped leaves with the narrower end towards the base, flowers with five sepals, five white petals and fourteen or fifteen stamens.

Description

Taxonomy and naming
Triplarina calophylla was first formally described by Anthony Bean in 1995 and the description was published in the journal Austrobaileya from specimens he collected at Mount Abbot near Bowen in 1992. The specific epithet (calophylla) means "beautiful leaf" and refers to the attractive foliage.

Distribution and habitat
This triplarina is only known from two populations near Mount Abbot and Cape Upstart. It grows in shallow sandy soil in shrubland and woodland.

Conservation status
Triplarina calophylla is classified as of "least concern" under the Queensland Government Nature Conservation Act 1992.

References

calophylla
Flora of Queensland
Plants described in 1995
Taxa named by Anthony Bean